Festuca groenlandica, commonly known as the Greenland fescue, is a species of grass in the Festuca genus and Poaceae family. It is endemic to Greenland. The Flora of North America accepts this species. Other sources regard it as a synonym of Festuca brachyphylla.

In 1977 it was considered a subspecies to F. brachyphylla by Signe Frederiksen, who then later in 1983 promoted it to its own species, F. groenlandica.

References 

Endemic flora of Greenland
groenlandica
Flora of Greenland